San Francesco is a medieval Roman Catholic church in Piacenza, Italy. It was built for a Franciscan order in a style described as Lombard Gothic.

History
The church and adjacent monastery were built for the Friars Minor order, between 1278 and 1363 under the patronage of the Ghibelline Umbertino Landi. It soon became a convent for nuns of the Clarissan order. From this church in 1547, Count Agostino Landi addressed the assembled people to announce that he and other nobles had murdered Pier Luigi Farnese, Duke of Parma. During the Napoleonic period despite a brief conversion of parts of the complex into armory and then a hospital, the church remained open. For a time it was dedicated to the early Christian martyr, St Napoleon. The church was returned to the clerics, but by 1810, they had left the convent. In 1848, the annexation of Piacenza to the Kingdom of Sardinia was proclaimed from this church.

The facade is in simple brick, but the interior church was amply decorated with frescoes and icons. The layout of this church resembles the plan of the basilica of San Francesco in Bologna, including the apse with radiating chapels. The façade has two buttresses, a rose window, spire and pinnacles. Only a porch remains of the adjacent monastery. The church contains frescoes from the 14th and 15th centuries. The lunette of the portal has a sculpture of  the St. Francis and the Stigmata (1480 ). The dome of the Chapel of the Immaculate Conception was decorated with frescoes (1597) by Giovanni Battista Trotti. The church also has altarpieces by Il Malosso (Annunciation and Birth of Mary), Bernardo Castelli, Clemente Ruta, Bartolomeo Schedone, Carlo Sacchi, Carlo Francesco Nuvolone, Camillo Procaccini, and  Bernardino Gatti.

Giuseppe Sacchini is buried in the church.

References

Churches completed in 1363
Roman Catholic churches in Piacenza
Gothic architecture in Emilia-Romagna
13th-century Roman Catholic church buildings in Italy
Christian monasteries established in the 13th century
Francesco Piacenza